= All-Star break =

All-Star break may refer to:

- MLB All-Star break, break for Major League Baseball All-Star Game
- NBA All-Star break, break for National Basketball Association All-Star Game
